Robert-Philippe Dollfus (20 July 1887 in Paris, France – 19 February 1976 in Paris, France) was a French zoologist and parasitologist.

Career
Robert-Philippe Dollfus was born in Paris on July 20, 1887, in a family of Protestant tradition. His father was Gustave Frédéric Dollfus, famous French geologist and malacologist.

Very early on, he attended the laboratories of Alfred Giard and that of Alfred Blanchard. As early as 1912, at the age of 25, he established the notion of metacercaria, a stage of the lifecycle of Digenea. In 1914, he was on an oceanographic mission aboard the Research Vessel "Pourquoi Pas?" under the orders of Jean-Baptiste Charcot. During the Second World War, he was a stretcher bearer and auxiliary doctor.

Between the wars, he occupied the very modest function of "préparateur" in a laboratory of the National Museum of Natural History in Paris. However, he was able to carry out scientific expeditions in Morocco (1923-1928), the Red Sea (1928-1929) and in 1929-1930 in the Atlantic on the RV "Pourquoi Pas?". He then studied fish and crustaceans, but began to study parasites, under the supervision of famous French parasitologist Émile Brumpt.

In 1941, he defended his thesis on Trypanorhyncha Cestodes, published in 1942. He was elected President of the Zoological Society of France in 1940. He then became Director of a laboratory at the École Pratique des Hautes Etudes in Paris. After the Second World War, he became a confirmed and famous helminthologist and parasitologist, but never succeeded in obtaining a post of Professor at the National Museum of Natural History. In 1957, despite his retirement, he continued to work every day at the National Museum of Natural History, practically until his death in 1976. In 1962, he was elected President of the French Society of Parasitology.

Every spring, Robert-Philippe Dollfus went to Morocco, where his daughter lived, to work at the Institut Scientifique Chérifien. He produced articles on helminths and a Catalog of Fishes from the Atlantic Coast of Morocco.

Robert-Philippe Dollfus’s immense scientific collections are now in the National Museum of Natural History in Paris.

Eponymous taxa

A number of taxa, generally parasites, were named in his honour.

Genera include the digenean Dollfustrema Eckmann, 1934, the cestode Dollfusiella Campbell & Beveridge, 1994, and the Acanthocephala Dollfusentis Golvan, 1969.

Species include the nematode Hassalstrongylus dollfusi (Díaz-Ungría, 1963) Durette-Desset, 1971.

Awards
Croix de Guerre
Legion of Honour (1953)

Books 
 Dollfus, R. P. (1942). Notes diverses sur les Tétrarhynques. Muséum national d'Histoire naturelle, Paris, 41p. (Mémoires du Muséum national d'Histoire naturelle - Nouvelle Série (1935-1950); 22 (5)).
 Dollfus R. P. 1946. Parasites (animaux et végétaux) des Helminthes. Hyperparasites, ennemis et prédateurs des Helminthes parasites et des Helminthes libres. Essai de compilation méthodique. Encyclopédie Biologique, volume XXVII. Paul Lechevalier, Paris, 483 pages.
 Dollfus, R. P. F. (1953). Aperçu général sur l'histoire naturelle des parasites animaux de la morue Atlanto-Arctique, Gadus callarias L. (Morhua L.) (Vol. 43). Paul Lechevalier, Paris.
 Dollfus, R. P. 1968. Les Trématodes de l’histoire naturelle des Helminthes de Félix Dujardin (1845). Muséum national d'Histoire naturelle, Paris, 77p. (Mémoires du Muséum national d'Histoire naturelle, Sér. A – Zoologie (1950-1992); 54 (3)).

A few articles
A few articles are listed here, among more than 160 published by Robert-Philippe Dollfus.

References

External links

1887 births
1976 deaths
French parasitologists
20th-century French zoologists
French taxonomists
Recipients of the Croix de Guerre (France)
Officiers of the Légion d'honneur
National Museum of Natural History (France) people
Scientists from Paris